Rights management may mean:

Digital rights management, access control technologies for copyright works
Performing rights management